= Angolan Futsal Championship =

- Founded: 1996
- Country: Angola
- Confederation: CAF
- Level on pyramid: 1
- Domestic cup: Angolan Cup
- Current champions: Coprat de Luanda (2018)
- Most championships: Toyota de Luanda (4 titles)
- Website: Official website
- Current: 2019

Angolan Futsal Championship (Portuguese: Campeonato Nacional de futebol salão em masculinos) is the premier futsal league in Angola. The competition is run by the Campeonato Nacional de futebol salão under the auspices of the Federação Angolana de Futebol de Salão (FAFUSA).

== List of champions ==
- 1996:
- 1997:
- 1998:
- 1999:
- 2000:
- 2001:
- 2002:
- 2003:
- 2004: Rádio Nacional de Angola
- 2005: Escholina Futuro da Nacion
- 2006: Toyota de Angola Luanda
- 2007: Toyota de Angola Luanda
- 2008: Toyota de Angola Luanda
- 2009: Toyota de Angola
- 2010: Banco BIC Luanda
- 2011: Toyota de Angola
- 2012: Ente Nacional Energia (ENE)
- 2013: Ente Nacional Energia (ENE)
- 2014: ENE de Luanda
- 2015: Clínica Sagrada Esperança
- 2016: RNT de Luanda
- 2017: RNT de Luanda
- 2018: Coprat de Luanda
- 2019:

== See also ==
- Angolan Futsal Cup
